is a Japanese footballer who plays for SC Sagamihara.

Club statistics
Updated to 23 February 2016.

References

External links

Profile at SC Sagamihara

1987 births
Living people
Kokushikan University alumni
People from Fujinomiya, Shizuoka
Association football people from Shizuoka Prefecture
Japanese footballers
J3 League players
Japan Football League players
SC Sagamihara players
Association football defenders